Dolgo Polje is a district of the City Municipality of Celje and a neighborhood of the city of Celje in central-eastern Slovenia.

Geography of Celje
Districts of the City Municipality of Celje